Sebastiano Mannironi (22 July 1930 – 11 June 2015) was an Italian weightlifter who competed at the 1956, 1960 and 1964 Summer Olympics; he won a bronze medal in 1960 and finished fifth in 1964. Between 1953 and 1966 Mannironi won 14 medals at European and World Championships, including a gold at the 1961 European Championships, and set one world record, in the snatch in 1958.

References

External links
Sebastiano Mannironi's obituary 

1930 births
2015 deaths
People from Nuoro
Sportspeople from Sardinia
Italian male weightlifters
Olympic weightlifters of Italy
Weightlifters at the 1956 Summer Olympics
Weightlifters at the 1960 Summer Olympics
Weightlifters at the 1964 Summer Olympics
Olympic bronze medalists for Italy
Olympic medalists in weightlifting
Medalists at the 1960 Summer Olympics
World Weightlifting Championships medalists
20th-century Italian people
21st-century Italian people